Ann Cecilia Sandell (born 10 June 1968) is a Swedish former association football midfielder who won 62 caps for the Sweden women's national football team, scoring three goals. She represented Sweden at the inaugural Olympic women's football tournament in 1996 and 2000.

Club career
In 1999 Sandell collected the Diamantbollen award for Sweden's best female footballer. She had signed for Älvsjö from Lindsdals in 1993 and been part of the team which won five consecutive Damallsvenskan titles from 1995 to 1999. Although signed as a midfielder, she was successfully converted to a central defender.

International career
Sandell made her senior Sweden debut in August 1992; a 3–3 draw with Norway. Her early national team career was marked by injury and she did not play at UEFA Women's Euro 1993 or the 1995 FIFA Women's World Cup, which Sweden hosted. Restored to the squad for the 1996 Olympics, Sandell also played at UEFA Women's Euro 1997, the 1999 FIFA Women's World Cup and the 2000 Olympics.

She went to UEFA Women's Euro 2001 as Sweden's press officer, as she had retired from playing to take up a position as Älvsjö's assistant coach.

Personal life
Sandell has a twin, Camilla, who is married to former footballer Victoria Svensson.

References

External links

1968 births
Living people
Swedish women's footballers
Sweden women's international footballers
Olympic footballers of Sweden
Footballers at the 1996 Summer Olympics
1999 FIFA Women's World Cup players
Footballers at the 2000 Summer Olympics
Damallsvenskan players
Women's association football defenders
People from Karlskrona
Sportspeople from Blekinge County
Lindsdals IF players